The 1909 World Allround Speed Skating Championships took place at 27 and 28 February 1909 at the ice rink Gamle Frogner in Kristiania, Norway.

Oscar Mathisen was defending champion and succeeded in prolonging his title.
He had the lowest number of points awarded, and no one won three distances. This was the first time that a World champion was declared without winning at least three distances.

Allround results 

  * = Fell
 NC = Not classified
 NF = Not finished
 NS = Not started
 DQ = Disqualified
Source: SpeedSkatingStats.com

Rules 
Four distances have to be skated:
 500m
 1500m
 5000m
 10000m

The ranking was made by award ranking points. The points were awarded to the skaters who had skated all the distances. The final ranking was then decided by ordering the skaters by lowest point totals.
 1 point for 1st place
 2 point for 2nd place
 3 point for 3rd place
 and so on

One could win the World Championships also by winning at least three of the four distances, so the ranking could be affected by this.

Silver and bronze medals were awarded.

References 

World Allround Speed Skating Championships, 1909
1909 World Allround
World Allround, 1909
International sports competitions in Oslo
1909 in Norwegian sport
February 1909 sports events
1900s in Oslo